The 2014 Lebanese Elite Cup is the 17th edition of this football tournament in Lebanon. The competition started on 23 August through to the final in September. This tournament used to include the six best teams from the 2013–14 Lebanese Premier League season, but this edition also featured Salam Zgharta, who only just avoided relegation in 10th place, but won the 2013–14 Lebanese FA Cup.

Group stage

Group A

Group B

Final stage

Semi finals

Final

Lebanese Elite Cup seasons
Elite
Lebanese Elite Cup 
Lebanese Elite Cup